Carl Friedrich Abel (22 December 1723 – 20 June 1787) was a German composer of the pre-Classical era. He was a renowned player of the viola da gamba, and produced significant compositions for that instrument. He was director of music at the Dresden court from 1743, and moved to London in 1759, becaming chamber-musician to Queen Charlotte in 1764. He founded a subscription concert series there with Johann Christian Bach.

Life 
Abel was born in Köthen, where his father, Christian Ferdinand Abel, had worked for years as the principal viola da gamba and cello player in the court orchestra of the prince of Anhalt-Köthen. In 1723 Abel senior became director of the orchestra, when the previous director, Johann Sebastian Bach, moved to Leipzig. The young Abel later boarded at St. Thomas School, Leipzig, where he was taught by Bach.

On Bach's recommendation in 1743 he was able to join Johann Adolph Hasse's orchestra at the Dresden court, where he remained for fifteen years. In 1759 (or 1758 according to Chambers), he went to England and became chamber-musician to Queen Charlotte, in 1764. He gave a concert of his own compositions in London, performing on various instruments, one of which was a five-string cello known as a pentachord, which had been recently invented by John Joseph Merlin.

In 1762, Johann Christian Bach, a son of J. S. Bach, joined him in London, and the friendship between him and Abel led, in 1764 or 1765, to the establishment of the famous Bach-Abel concerts, England's first subscription concerts. In those concerts, many celebrated guest artists appeared, and many works of Haydn received their first English performance.

For ten years the concerts were organized by Teresa Cornelys, a retired Venetian opera singer who owned a concert hall at Carlisle House in Soho Square, then the height of fashionable events. In 1775 the concerts became independent of her, to be continued by Abel and Bach until Bach's death in 1782. Abel still remained in great demand as a player on various instruments new and old. He traveled to Germany and France between 1782 and 1785, and upon his return to London, became a leading member of the Grand Professional Concerts at the Hanover Square Rooms in Soho. Throughout his life he had enjoyed excessive living, and his drinking probably hastened his death.

Abel died in London on 20 June 1787. He was buried in the churchyard of St Pancras Old Church.

Works 
One of Abel's works became famous due to a misattribution: in the 19th century, a manuscript symphony in the hand of Wolfgang Amadeus Mozart, was catalogued as his Symphony no. 3 in E flat, K. 18, and was published as such in the first complete edition of Mozart's works by Breitkopf & Härtel. Later, it was discovered that this symphony was actually the work of Abel, copied by the boy Mozart—evidently for study purposes—while he was visiting London in 1764. That symphony was originally published as the concluding work in Abel's Six Symphonies, Op. 7.

A revised catalogue, of now 420 works, was published by Ortus Musikverlag in 2023, Catalogue of Works of Carl Friedrich Abel or AbelWV, edited by Günter von Zadow. It takes into account many newly discovered works, and additional sources for known works.

Major works by opus number 

 Op. 1: 6 Overtures or Sinfonias (1761)
 Op. 2: 6 Sonatas for keyboard, and violin and cello (ad libitum) (1760)
 Op. 3: 6 Trio Sonatas for 2 violins and basso continuo (1762)
 Op. 4: 6 Overtures or Sinfonias (1762)
 Op. 5: 6 Sonatas for keyboard, and violin and cello (ad libitum) (1762)
 Op. 6: 6 Sonatas for keyboard and flute (1763)
 Op. 7: 6 Symphonies (1767)
 Op. 8: 6 String Quartets (1768)
 Op. 9: 6 Trio Sonatas for violin, cello and basso continuo (1771)
 Op. 10: 6 Symphonies (1771)
 Op. 11: 6 Concerti for keyboard and strings (1771)
 Op. 12: 6 Flute Quartets (1774)
 Op. 13: 6 Sonatas for keyboard and violin (1777)
 Op. 14: 6 Symphonies (1778)
 Op. 15: 6 String Quartets (1780)
 Op. 16: 4 Trio Sonatas for 2 flutes and basso continuo (1781)
 Op. 16: 6 Trio Sonatas for violin, viola and cello (1782)
 Op. 17: 6 Symphonies (1785)
 Op. 18: 6 Sonatas for keyboard and violin (1784)

Extended 1971 works list 

The following list follows the 1971 Knape catalogue.
Symphony Op. 1 No.1 in B flat major, WK 1
Symphony Op. 1 No.2 in C major, WK 2
Symphony Op. 1 No.3 in D major, WK 3
Symphony Op. 1 No.4 in E flat major, WK 4
Symphony Op. 1 No.5 in F major, WK 5
Symphony Op. 1 No.6 in G major, WK 6
Symphony Op. 4 No.1 in D major, WK 7
Symphony Op. 4 No.2 in B flat major, WK 8
Symphony Op. 4 No.3 in E flat major, WK 9
Symphony Op. 4 No.4 in C major, WK 10
Symphony Op. 4 No.5 in G major, WK 11
Symphony Op. 4 No.6 in D major, WK 12
Symphony Op. 7 No.1 in G major, WK 13
Symphony Op. 7 No.2 in B flat major, WK 14
Symphony Op. 7 No.3 in D major, WK 15
Symphony Op. 7 No.4 in F major, WK 16
Symphony Op. 7 No.5 in C major, WK 17
Symphony Op. 7 No.6 in E flat major, WK 18
Symphony Op. 10 No.1 in E major, WK 19
Symphony Op. 10 No.2 in B flat major, WK 20
Symphony Op. 10 No.3 in E flat major, WK 21
Symphony Op. 10 No.4 in C major, WK 22
Symphony Op. 10 No.5 in D major, WK 23
Symphony Op. 10 No.6 in A major, WK 24
Symphony Op. 14 No.1 in C major, WK 25
Symphony Op. 14 No.2 in E flat major, WK 26
Symphony Op. 14 No.3 in D major, WK 27
Symphony Op. 14 No.4 in B flat major, WK 28
Symphony Op. 14 No.5 in G major, WK 29
Symphony Op. 14 No.6 in E flat major, WK 30
Symphony Op. 17 No.1 in E flat major, WK 31
Symphony Op. 17 No.2 in B flat major, WK 32
Symphony Op. 17 No.3 in D major, WK 33
Symphony Op. 17 No.4 in C major, WK 34
Symphony Op. 17 No.5 in B flat major, WK 35
Symphony Op. 17 No.6 in G major, WK 36
Symphony in C major, WK 37
Symphony in B flat major, WK 38
Symphony in E flat major, WK 39
Symphony in B flat major, WK 40
Symphony in D major, WK 41
Sinfonia concertante for oboe quartet in B flat major, WK 42
Sinfonia concertante for oboe quartet in D major, WK 43
Periodical Overture in D major, WK 44
Overture to 'Love in a village' in D major, WK 45a
Overture to 'The summer's tale' in B flat major, WK 45b
Flute Concerto No.1 in C major, WK 46
Flute Concerto No.2 in E minor, WK 47
Flute Concerto No.3 in D major, WK 48
Flute Concerto No.4 in C major, WK 49
Flute Concerto No.5 in G major, WK 50
Flute Concerto No.6 in C major, WK 51
Cello Concerto in B flat major, WK 52
Keyboard Concerto Op. 11 No.1 in F major, WK 53
Keyboard Concerto Op. 11 No.2 in B flat major, WK 54
Keyboard Concerto Op. 11 No.3 in E flat major, WK 55
Keyboard Concerto Op. 11 No.4 in D major, WK 56
Keyboard Concerto Op. 11 No.5 in G major, WK 57
Keyboard Concerto Op. 11 No.6 in C major, WK 58
Flute Concerto No.7 in D major, WK 59
Cello Concerto in C major, WK 60
String Quartet Op. 8 No.1 in F major, WK 61
String Quartet Op. 8 No.2 in B flat major, WK 62
String Quartet Op. 8 No.3 in E flat major, WK 63
String Quartet Op. 8 No.4 in D major, WK 64
String Quartet Op. 8 No.5 in A major, WK 65
String Quartet Op. 8 No.6 in F major, WK 66
Flute Quartet Op. 12 No.1 in C major, WK 67
Flute Quartet Op. 12 No.2 in A major, WK 68
Flute Quartet Op. 12 No.3 in F major, WK 69
Flute Quartet Op. 12 No.4 in D major, WK 70
Flute Quartet Op. 12 No.5 in B flat major, WK 71
Flute Quartet Op. 12 No.6 in G major, WK 72
String Quartet Op. 15 No.1 in E major, WK 73
String Quartet Op. 15 No.2 in C major, WK 74
String Quartet Op. 15 No.3 in E flat major, WK 75
String Quartet Op. 15 No.4 in G major, WK 76
String Quartet Op. 15 No.5 in F major, WK 77
String Quartet Op. 15 No.6 in A major, WK 78
Raccolta for keyboard in C major, WK 79a
Raccolta for keyboard in B flat major, WK 79b
Trio Sonata Op. 3 No.1 in G major, WK 80
Trio Sonata Op. 3 No.2 in C major, WK 81
Trio Sonata Op. 3 No.3 in B flat major, WK 82
Trio Sonata Op. 3 No.4 in D major, WK 83
Trio Sonata Op. 3 No.5 in A major, WK 84
Trio Sonata Op. 3 No.6 in E flat major, WK 85
Trio Sonata Op. 9 No.1 in A major, WK 86
Trio Sonata Op. 9 No.2 in C major, WK 87
Trio Sonata Op. 9 No.3 in G major, WK 88
Trio Sonata Op. 9 No.4 in B flat major, WK 89
Trio Sonata Op. 9 No.5 in D major, WK 90
Trio Sonata Op. 9 No.6 in F major, WK 91
Trio Sonata Op. 16a No.1 in G major, WK 92
Trio Sonata Op. 16a No.2 in D major, WK 93
Trio Sonata Op. 16a No.3 in C major, WK 94
Trio Sonata Op. 16a No.4 in A major, WK 95
Trio Sonata Op. 16a No.5 in D major, WK 96
Trio Sonata Op. 16a No.6 in G major, WK 97
Trio Sonata Op. 16b No.1 in G major, WK 98
Trio Sonata Op. 16b No.2 in D major, WK 99
Trio Sonata Op. 16b No.3 in C major, WK 100
Trio Sonata Op. 16b No.4 in G major, WK 101
Trio Sonata for 2 violins & cello in A major, WK 102
Trio Sonata for 2 violins & cello in A major, WK 103
Trio Sonata for 2 flutes & cello in G major, WK 104
Trio Sonata for 2 flutes & cello in D major, WK 105
Trio Sonata for 2 flutes & cello in G major, WK 106
Trio Sonata for 2 flutes & cello in F major, WK 107
Trio Sonata for 2 flutes & cello in C minor, WK 108
Trio Sonata for 2 flutes & cello in G major, WK 109
Trio Sonata for 2 flutes & cello in G major, WK 110
Trio Sonata for 2 flutes & cello in D major, WK 110a
Trio Sonata for 2 flutes & cello in G major, WK 110b
Trio Sonata for 2 flutes & cello in C major, WK 110c
Trio Sonata for 2 flutes & cello in B flat major, WK 110d
Trio Sonata for 2 flutes & cello in C major, WK 110e
Trio Sonata for 2 flutes & cello in C major, WK 110f
Keyboard Trio Op. 2 No.1 in C major, WK 111
Keyboard Trio Op. 2 No.2 in F major, WK 112
Keyboard Trio Op. 2 No.3 in D major, WK 113
Keyboard Trio Op. 2 No.4 in B flat major, WK 114
Keyboard Trio Op. 2 No.5 in G major, WK 115
Keyboard Trio Op. 2 No.6 in E flat major, WK 116
Keyboard Trio Op. 5 No.1 in B flat major, WK 117
Keyboard Trio Op. 5 No.2 in G major, WK 118
Keyboard Trio Op. 5 No.3 in E major, WK 119
Keyboard Trio Op. 5 No.4 in C major, WK 120
Keyboard Trio Op. 5 No.5 in A major, WK 121
Keyboard Trio Op. 5 No.6 in F major, WK 122
Flute Sonata Op. 6 No.1 in C major, WK 123
Flute Sonata Op. 6 No.2 in G major, WK 124
Flute Sonata Op. 6 No.3 in G major, WK 125
Flute Sonata Op. 6 No.4 in E major, WK 126
Flute Sonata Op. 6 No.5 in F major, WK 127
Flute Sonata Op. 6 No.6 in G major, WK 128
Violin Sonata Op. 13 No.1 in G major, WK 129
Violin Sonata Op. 13 No.2 in F major, WK 130
Violin Sonata Op. 13 No.3 in A major, WK 131
Violin Sonata Op. 13 No.4 in B flat major, WK 132
Violin Sonata Op. 13 No.5 in C major, WK 133
Violin Sonata Op. 13 No.6 in E flat major, WK 134
Violin Sonata Op. 18 No.1 in G major, WK 135
Violin Sonata Op. 18 No.2 in A major, WK 136
Violin Sonata Op. 18 No.3 in C major, WK 137
Violin Sonata Op. 18 No.4 in E flat major, WK 138
Violin Sonata Op. 18 No.5 in B flat major, WK 139
Violin Sonata Op. 18 No.6 in F major, WK 140
Violin Sonata in C major, WK 140a
Keyboard Sonata in B flat major, WK 140b
Sonata for viola da gamba No. 1 in C major, WK 141
Sonata for viola da gamba No. 2 in A major, WK 142
Sonata for viola da gamba No. 3 in D major, WK 143
Sonata for viola da gamba No. 4 in G major, WK 144
Sonata for viola da gamba No. 5 in A major, WK 145
Sonata for viola da gamba No. 6 in E minor, WK 146
Sonata for viola da gamba No. 7 in G major, WK 147
Sonata for viola da gamba No. 8 in A major, WK 148
Sonata for viola da gamba No. 9 in G major, WK 149
Sonata for viola da gamba No.10 in E minor, WK 150
Sonata for viola da gamba No.11 in C major, WK 151
Sonata for viola da gamba No.12 in G major, WK 152
Sonata for viola da gamba No.13 in G major, WK 153
Sonata for viola da gamba No.14 in D major, WK 154
Sonata for viola da gamba No.15 in G major, WK 155
Sonata for viola da gamba No.16 in D major, WK 156
Sonata for viola da gamba No.17 in E minor, WK 157
Sonata for viola da gamba No.18 in D major, WK 158
Sonata for viola da gamba No.19 in G major, WK 159
Sonata for viola da gamba No.20 in D major, WK 160
Sonata for viola da gamba No.21 in D major, WK 161
Sonata for viola da gamba No.22 in C major, WK 162
Sonata for viola da gamba No.23 in A major, WK 163
Sonata for viola da gamba No.24 in A major, WK 164
Sonata for viola da gamba No.25 in D major, WK 165
Sonata for viola da gamba No.26 in D major, WK 166
Sonata for viola da gamba No.27 in G major, WK 167
Sonata for viola da gamba No.28 in D major, WK 168
Sonata for viola da gamba No.29 in D major, WK 169
Sonata for viola da gamba No.30 in C major, WK 170
Sonata for viola da gamba No.31 in G major, WK 171
Sonata for viola da gamba No.32 in D major, WK 172
Sonata for viola da gamba No.33 in A major, WK 173
Sonata for viola da gamba No.34 in G major, WK 174
Sonata for viola da gamba No.35 in A minor, WK 175
Sonata for viola da gamba No.36 in F minor, WK 176
Sonata for viola da gamba No.37 in A major, WK 177
Sonata for viola da gamba No.38 in G major, WK 178
Sonata for viola da gamba No.39 in A major, WK 179
Sonata for viola da gamba No.40 in D major, WK 180
Sonata for viola da gamba No.41 in D major, WK 181
Sonata for viola da gamba No.42 in G major, WK 182
Sonata for viola da gamba No.43 in A major, WK 183
Sonata for viola da gamba No.44 in C major, WK 184
Arpeggio for viola da gamba in D major, WK 185
Allegro for viola da gamba in D major, WK 186
Piece for viola da gamba in D major, WK 187
Tempo fi minuetto for viola da gamba in D major, WK 188
Adagio for viola da gamba in D major, WK 189
Vivace for viola da gamba in D major, WK 190
Andante for viola da gamba in D major, WK 191
Piece for viola da gamba in D major, WK 192
Piece for viola da gamba in D major, WK 193
Piece for viola da gamba in D major, WK 194
Piece for viola da gamba in D major, WK 195
Fuga for viola da gamba in D major, WK 196
Piece for viola da gamba in D major, WK 197
Allegro for viola da gamba in D major, WK 198
Piece for viola da gamba in D major, WK 199
Tempo di minuetto for viola da gamba in D major, WK 200
Tempo di minuetto for viola da gamba in D major, WK 201
Piece for viola da gamba in D major, WK 202
Piece for viola da gamba in D major, WK 203
Con variatione for viola da gamba in D major, WK 204
Piece for viola da gamba in D minor, WK 205
Piece for viola da gamba in D minor, WK 206
Allegro for viola da gamba in D minor, WK 207
Piece for viola da gamba in D minor, WK 208
Adagio for viola da gamba in D minor, WK 209
Minuetto for viola da gamba in D major, WK 210
Allegretto for viola da gamba in A major, WK 211
Allegro for viola da gamba in A major, WK 212
Minuet for keyboard in C major, WK 213
Minuet for keyboard in D major, WK 214
Minuet for keyboard in G major, WK 215
Minuet for keyboard in G major, WK 216
March in F major, WK 217
March in F major, WK 218
March in F major, WK 219
March in F major, WK 220
March in F major, WK 221
March in B flat major, WK 222
March in F major, WK 223
Andante for string quartet in E flat major, WK 224
Flute Quartet in F major, WK 225
Flute Quartet in D major, WK 226
Flute Quartet with viola da gamba in G major, WK 227
Cello Duet in D major, WK 228
Concertino for 2 clarinets in E flat major (lost), WK 229
5 adagios for string quartet, WK 230
Dolly's eyes are so bright, WK 231
4 soli for flute (lost), WK 232
Frena le belle lagrime, WK deest

Notes and references
Notes

References

Sources

S. M. Helm: Carl Friedrich Abel, Symphonist. London 1953
'Karl Friedrich Abel (1723–87)' by Andrew Pink, in Le Monde maçonnique des Lumières (Europe-Amériques) Dictionnaire prosopographique. Charles Porset and Cécile Révauger (eds) Paris: Editions Champion, 2013.

External links

 
 newly found manuscripts in 2017
 
 

1723 births
1787 deaths
People from Köthen (Anhalt)
People from Anhalt-Köthen
German male classical composers
German Classical-period composers
German viol players
18th-century classical composers
18th-century male musicians
18th-century musicians
18th-century German people
People educated at the St. Thomas School, Leipzig
Pupils of Johann Sebastian Bach
Alcohol-related deaths in England
Burials at St Pancras Old Church
String quartet composers